Ivan Mikhailovich Chisov (1916–1986) was a Soviet Air Force lieutenant who survived a fall of approximately 7,000 meters (23,000 feet).

Biography
Lieutenant Colonel Chisov was a navigator on a Soviet Air Force Ilyushin Il-4 bomber. In January 1942, Luftwaffe fighters attacked his bomber, forcing him to bail out. Nikolai Zhugan, a crewman on Chisov's flight, later said that Chisov leapt from the plane at an altitude of approximately 7,000 meters (23,000 feet), though other references list Chisov's fall at 6,700 meters (Zhugan himself waited until the plane was at about 5000 meters before also bailing out).

With the air battle still raging around him, Chisov intentionally did not open his parachute, since he feared that he would be an easy target for an angry German pilot while he was dangling from his parachute harness. He planned to drop below the level of the battle, and open his chute, when he was out of sight of the fighters. Due to the thin atmosphere at that altitude, however, he lost consciousness and was unable to pull the rip cord.

The aerial battle had been seen by cavalry commander General Pavel Alexeyevich Belov. When Chisov was seen falling to the ground, cavalrymen rushed to the site, and were surprised to find Chisov alive, still wearing his unopened parachute. Chisov regained consciousness a short time later.

Chisov suffered severe injuries, including spinal injuries and a broken pelvis. He was operated on by surgeon Y. Gudynsky, and for a month his condition was considered critical. Despite his injuries, he was able to fly again three months later. He requested to continue flying combat missions, but was instead sent to become a navigational trainer.

Chisov flew over 70 combat missions during the course of his career.

After the war, he graduated from the Military-Political Academy. On his departure from the reserve, he became a propagandist for the Central House of the Soviet Army.

Awards
 Order of the Red Banner (23.07.1943)
 Order of the Patriotic War 1st class (1985)
 Medal "For the Defence of Moscow"
 Medal "For the Defence of Leningrad"
 Medal "For the Victory over Germany in the Great Patriotic War 1941–1945"
 Jubilee Medal "Twenty Years of Victory in the Great Patriotic War 1941–1945"
 Jubilee Medal "Thirty Years of Victory in the Great Patriotic War 1941–1945"
 Jubilee Medal "Forty Years of Victory in the Great Patriotic War 1941–1945"

See also

 Fall survivors
 Nicholas Alkemade, British bomber tailgunner who survived falling from his burning Avro Lancaster B Mk. II in 1944
 Juliane Koepcke, who survived a 3 kilometre fall after her Lockheed Electra flight broke up over the Peruvian Amazon in 1971
 Alan Magee, American, World War II airman who survived a 22,000-foot (6,700 m) fall from his damaged B-17F Flying Fortress in 1943
 Vesna Vulović, Serbian flight attendant who survived the mid-air breakup of her McDonnell Douglas DC-9 in 1972
 Other
 Freefall
 List of sole survivors of aviation accidents or incidents

References

 Gunbin NA In the stormy sky. Yaroslavl: Upper Volga. the book. Press, 1984.
 Golovanov, AE Long-range bombers. Moscow: OOO "Delta National Bank," 2004.
 DB Khazanov An unknown battle in the skies of Moscow in 1941–1942. Counterattack. Moscow: Publishing House "Technology Youth," 2001.

1916 births
1986 deaths
Fall survivors
Soviet Air Force officers
Shot-down aviators
Soviet military personnel of World War II